Christine Renard (1929  – November 7, 1979) was a French writer of science fiction and fantasy.

She was born in the small town of Nièvre. She began her studies in Clermont-Ferrand before studying psychology in Paris. Her literary career began in 1962, but was cut short by cancer. She won the Prix Rosny-Aîné posthumously for the story La nuit des albiens.

1929 births
1979 deaths
French science fiction writers
Women science fiction and fantasy writers
French women novelists
20th-century French women writers
20th-century French novelists